Football Club Aboomoslem Khorasan (Bashgah-e Futbal-e Abumislâm-e Xerasan), commonly known as Aboomoslem, is an Iranian football club based in Mashhad, Razavi Khorasan, that competes in the League 3. The club was founded in 1970 and is named after Persian general of Abbasid Era, Abu Muslim, who was commander of the Abbasid Revolution and led the Abbasid Revolution that toppled the Umayyad dynasty.

The football team plays its home games at the Samen Stadium which has a seating capacity of 27,000. The club is owned and supported by Mohammad Reza Abbasi.

Aboomoslem is the oldest existing football club in Mashhad and has a large history in Khorasan football. It is one of the most supported clubs in Khorasan football, having won four League 2 trophies, three Khorasan League titles, and one final participation in the Hazfi Cup. Aboomoslem holds a long-standing enmity with provincial rivals Payam Khorasan known as the Mashhad derby.

History

Establishment
In 1970 a group of football players from Mashhad decided to create a new football team by the name of Aboumoslem. Most of the players on the team knew each other and were from the Shah Abbasi Tri-way area. They had grown up playing football on the dirt fields of the area. When the Takht Jamshid Cup was created, a qualification tournament for provincial representatives was set up in Isfahan. Another club from Mashhad, named Arya F.C. represented the province of Khorasan but they were not able to make into the Takht Jamshid Cup.

After defeat in the tournament, it was decided that for Khorasan to have a powerful football team, Aboumoslem and Aria must merge. Three brothers by the names of Ataollah, Asghar and Heshmat Mohajerani helped to merge the clubs, and Aboumoslem was able to make it to the 1975 Takht Jamshid Cup, which was the top football league in Iran before the Iranian revolution. The team originally only wore black, but red was added late on. With the purchase of great players like Asgarkhani, Majid Tashrefi, Masih Masihnia, Alireza Ligarab, Hossein Omidvar and Mahmood Ebrahimzadeh they were able to become the best non-Tehran based club in the league that year. Success was short lived and the team was relegated the next season, staying in the 2nd division until the revolution.

Post Revolution
Like most sporting clubs in Iran, the revolution and the Iran–Iraq War severely limited the team's activities. From 1980 to 1984 the club participated in almost no meaningful competitions. This changed when in late 1984 local and provincial leagues were set up. In 1986 Aboumoslem won the Mashhad city league and the provincial championship in the following season. In the late 1980s, Shahdiran Inc. sponsored the team, giving the club a better chance at success. After the war the local and provincial leagues were scrapped in favor of nationwide leagues.

Among the notable players was Abolfazl Safavi, a quick forward-midfielder with small body and great ability to dribble, who played for several seasons until 1981. He was later arrested and executed for membership in a banned opposition group.

Aboumoslem made it to the newly established Azadegan League and participated during the 1990–91 and 1991–92 seasons, but was relegated after only two years. It was during this time that Aboumoslem's most famous player, Khodadad Azizi was discovered. Once relegated the club struggled dramatically, being relegated all the way to the third division, which was a local league. Shahdiran stopped sponsoring the team and was replaced by soft drink company, Khoshgovar. 
After several seasons in the lower leagues, Aboumoslem finally made it back to the top level of Iranian football, gaining promotion to the Azadegan League during the 1997–98 season. Aboumoslem had been in a poor financial situation that season, as Khoshgovar had stopped being its sponsor. Aboumoslem's only revenue came from advertisements and support from club fans, but surprisingly won promotion with the help of former Aboumoslem player, Akbar Misaghian. Aboumoslem again only stayed in the league for two seasons and was relegated during the 1999–2000 season. Around the same time the club went back to its roots, once again being sponsored by the Iranian police.

Iran Pro League
They were promoted again in the next season and debuted in Iran's first fully professional league, the IPL, for the 2001–02 season. They have remained in the IPL since with two 5th-place finishes being their best results. During this time the club has shown its skill for finding talented players, with famous Iranian football players such as Reza Enayati, Mojtaba Jabari and Andranik Teymourian all making their names there. After the 2004–05 season Aboumoslem's new sponsor became Iran Khodro.

Recent
In 2006 Khodadad Azizi joined the club as an advisor, beginning his new life in football management after retirement from playing. Akbar Misaghian the club's manager for the past two seasons resigned after the first week of the 2006–07 season due to financial disagreements with management. In January 2007, it became official and Khodadad Azizi was named manager of Aboumoslem. He was sacked less than a year later and replaced by Parviz Mazloomi in October 2007.Which he had a good season with the team and finished the league in the top half of the league but the season after he left the club for a better offer and the club had a very difficult season which they avoided the relegation in the last week and changed three head coaches and three chairmen but their instability continued for the 2009–10 season where they finished last and got relegated. In 2014 for the first time in the club's history the team was relegated to the 2nd Division.

Bankruptcy
Because of the financial problems suffered by the club, On 7 September 2014 the Ministry of Youth Affairs and Sports declared the bankruptcy of F.C. Aboomoslem. The new chairman Mehdi Biglari re-established the club in 2014 as Toloe Nasl e Aboomoslem Football Club. Aboomoslem restarted operations in 2016 and started competing in the fourth tier.

Logo history

Mashhad Derby

The Mashhad derby also known as the Khorasan derby is a football local derby match between the two most popular clubs from Mashhad: F.C. Aboomoslem and Payam Khorasan. Back in the 1980s and early 1990s it was Iran's second most important derby after the Tehran derby. Nowadays it has lost its status to more popular derbies such as Esfahan derby, Ahvaz derby and Shiraz derby.

Stadium
The club currently plays in Samen Stadium after years of playing in Mashhad's Takhti Stadium. The club recently announced plans to construct their own stadium with the help of the provincial government. The land was awarded to the team during Karim Malahi's time as club chairman. Construction was planned to begin March 2007 in the Elahieh area of Mashhad.

Supporters

Fan base
Aboomoslem is the most popular club from Khorasan with huge fan base in Razavi Khorasan Province, North Khorasan, South Khorasan and also in (Herat Province, Afghanistan) where there is a club by the name of Abumoslem Herat F.C.. In Mashhad, its popularity is only rivaled by Tehran's two biggest clubs Esteghlal F.C. and Persepolis F.C., and cross-city rival Payam Khorasan who has a smaller fan base.

Famous fans

Mohammad Bagher Ghalibaf – Mayor of Tehran
Saeed Soheili – Film Director
Reza Ghoochannejhad – Football player for Iran national football team and Heerenveen.

Season-by-season
The table below chronicles the achievements of Aboumoslem in various competitions.

Club chairmen

 Heshmat Mohajerani
 Hadi Khayami
 ? Sharifian
 Bagher Sayammi
 Jahangir Sadehdel
 Hamid Tayebbi
 Mahmoud Haj Rezapour
 Rahman Naderi
 Gholam Hossein Takaffoli
 Gholam Reza Basiripour
 Nasser Shafagh
 Mahdi Najami
 Karim Malahi (1996-06)
 Nasser Shafagh (2006–08)
 Mostafa Bani-Asad (2008–09)
 Hossein Ghasemi (2009–10)
 Esmaeil Vafaei (2010–2014)
 Mehdii Biglari (2014–present)

Club managers

  Seyed Mehdi Qiyassi (1974)
  Abbas Razavi (1974)
  Ştefan Stănculescu (1974)
  Seyed Mehdi Qiyassi (1974–1986)
  Seyed Kazem Ghiyassian(c.early 1990s)
  Hossein Fekri (1995–96)
  Mehdi Dinvarzadeh (1996–97)
  Akbar Misaghian (1997–99)
  Farhad Kazemi (2000–01)
  Firouz Karimi (2001–02)
  Mahmoud Yavari (2002–03)
  Akbar Misaghian (2003–06)
  Mehdi Ghiasi (2006)
  Khodadad Azizi (2006–07)
  Parviz Mazloomi (2007–08)
  Akbar Misaghian (2008)
  Hadi Bargizar (2008)
  Amir Hossein Peyrovani (2008)
  Ali Hanteh (2008–09)
  Naser Pourmehdi (2009)
  Farhad Kazemi (2009–10)
  Nader Dastneshan (2010)
  Majid Namjoo-Motlagh (2010)
  Asghar Sadri (2010)
  Seyed Kazem Ghiyassian (2010–11)
  Ali Hanteh (2011)
  Seyed Kazem Ghiyassian (2011)
  Khodadad Azizi (2011–12)
  Gholam Hossein Peyrovani (2012)
  Hadi Bargizar (2012–13)
  Ali Hanteh (2013–2014 )
  Saeed Josheshi (2014–)

Honours

Club honours

League
2nd Division
Champions (4): 1974–75, 1977–78, 1990–91, 2000–01
Khorasan Football League
Champions (3): 1987–88, 1989–90, 1993–94
Runners-up (1): 1988–89
Mashhad Football League
Champions (2): 1984–85, 1985–86

Cup
Hazfi Cup:
Runners-up (1): 2004–05
AK Pipe International Cup:
Champions (1): 2001

Individual honours
top scorers in Iranian League

Players
As of 10 September 2013:

First-team squad

 (U23)
 (U23)
 (U23)
 (U23)
 (U23)
 (U23)
 (U23)

For recent transfers, see List of Iranian football transfers winter 2013–14.

Former players
For details on former players, see :Category:Aboomoslem players.

Aboomoslem Players at major tournaments
The following players were selected for their national teams for major tournaments while playing for Aboomoslem:

References

External links

 Official site
 Official Fan site
 Official Popular comments site

Aboumoslem
Aboumoslem
1970 establishments in Iran
Sport in Mashhad